Özge Bayrak (born 14 February 1992) is a Turkish badminton player. She is coached by Çağatay Taşdemir at Egospor club of Ankara Metropolis Municipality. Currently, she is studying at Aksaray University.

She competed at various international tournaments in singles and doubles with her partner Neslihan Yiğit. At the 2013 Mediterranean Games held in Mersin, Turkey, she won the silver medal in the women's singles event, and the gold medal in the women's doubles event along with Neslihan Yiğit.

In August 2014, the National Olympic Committee of Turkey named her one of the sixteen "golden" sportspeople of Turkey, who have a great chance to win a medal at the 2016 Summer Olympics. The committee decided to back up those sportspeople. She won the bronze medal in the women's singles event at the 2014 European Championships in Kazan, Russia.

Achievements

European Games 
Women's doubles

European Championships 
Women's singles

Mediterranean Games 
Women's singles

Women's doubles

European Junior Championships 
Girls' singles

BWF International Challenge/Series (19 titles, 33 runners-up) 
Women's singles

Women's doubles

Mixed doubles

  BWF International Challenge tournament
  BWF International Series tournament
  BWF Future Series tournament

See also 
 Turkish women in sports

References

External links 
 
 
 
 

1992 births
Living people
People from Osmangazi
Sportspeople from Bursa
Turkish female badminton players
Badminton players at the 2016 Summer Olympics
Olympic badminton players of Turkey
Badminton players at the 2015 European Games
European Games medalists in badminton
European Games bronze medalists for Turkey
Competitors at the 2013 Mediterranean Games
Competitors at the 2022 Mediterranean Games
Mediterranean Games gold medalists for Turkey
Mediterranean Games silver medalists for Turkey
Mediterranean Games bronze medalists for Turkey
Mediterranean Games medalists in badminton
20th-century Turkish sportswomen
21st-century Turkish sportswomen